Eugene Hollander (14 December 1912 – 15 December 1996) was a Hungarian survivor of the Holocaust. He wrote a memoir, From the Hell of the Holocaust: A Survivor's Story, about his ordeal in Nazi Germany.

He was born in Khust in December 1912, but raised in Técső, then part of the Kingdom of Hungary, but today in modern-day Ukraine. He was a first cousin of Edith Frank (Anne Frank's mother) who was the daughter of his maternal uncle and also the cousin-in-law of Otto Frank. Separated from his wife Monica for 14 months, they eventually reunited and moved to the United States. Hollander died in New York City, New York in December 1996 at the age of 84. His widow, Monica, posthumously published his memoir in 2000. She died in 2014. The Eugene and Monica E. Hollander Foundation was a New York-based charity subsequently set established in their memory.

Works

References

1912 births
1996 deaths
Hungarian Jews
Hollander, Eugene
People from Zakarpattia Oblast
Hungarian emigrants to the United States
Anne Frank